Şanlıurfa GAP Airport  is an airport located in Şanlıurfa Province, Turkey.

The airport is part of the Southeastern Anatolia Project (known as "GAP"), a regional development project in the area of the Atatürk Dam. The new airport is known as the "GAP airport" because it is designed to service the workers in the GAP project as well as the city of Şanlıurfa.

The airport facilities include cafes, car hire offices, and airline ticket offices, but almost all facilities, including even the taxi rank, are staffed only when flights are due.

The airport operates special flights to Saudi Arabia during Hajj and Umrah season to Jeddah Airport and Medina Airport

Airlines and destinations

Ground transportation
Havaş operates shuttle buses from and to the airport to the city centre and to Siverek. Airport has its own taxi services and special chauffeurs may be arranged by the airport if requested

Traffic Statistics

External links

References

 

Airports in Turkey
Buildings and structures in Şanlıurfa Province
Transport in Şanlıurfa Province